Thalayamangalam is a village in the Orathanadu taluk of Thanjavur district, Tamil Nadu, India.

Demographics 

As per the 2001 census, Thalayamangalam had a total population of 1741 with 877 males and 864 females. The sex ratio was 985. The literacy rate was 67.88.

References 

 

Villages in Thanjavur district